Aloha from Hell was a German rock band. They won a competition in the German magazine Bravo. After the win they released "Don't Gimme That." Their first album, No More Days to Waste, sold more than 200,000 copies.

History 
Aloha from Hell was founded in 2006. The band won German magazine Bravo'''s Newcomer Band Contest'' in August 2007, and as a result secured a record deal with Sony BMG soon after.

Although the band members were German, all their songs were sung in English.

The band split up in mid-2010.

Discography

Albums

Extended plays

Singles

Other songs and appearances

Awards  
 2008: Bayerischer Musiklöwe (Bavarian Lion of Music)
 2009: Viva COMET : Breakthrough Artist of the year (nominated with: Eisblume, Polarkreis 18, Fady Maalouf and Queensberry)

External links
Aloha From Hell's official website

German pop music groups